Bagh-e Behzad (also Romanized as Bāgh-e Behzād and Bāgh Behzād) is a village in Javanmardi Rural District of the Central District of Khanmirza County, Chaharmahal and Bakhtiari province, Iran. At the 2006 census, its population was 1,911 in 354 households, when it was in Lordegan County before Khanmirza County was established. The following census in 2011 counted 2,202 people in 576 households. The latest census in 2016 showed a population of 2,454 people in 732 households; it was the largest village in its rural district. The village is populated by Lurs.

References 

Khanmirza County

Populated places in Chaharmahal and Bakhtiari Province

Populated places in Khanmirza County

Luri settlements in Chaharmahal and Bakhtiari Province